Girardville is a borough in Schuylkill County, Pennsylvania, United States,  northwest of Reading. Anthracite coal deposits are in the region. Coal-mining provided employment and incomes for many of the 3,666 people who lived there in 1900. In 1910, 4,396 individuals called it home. The population was 1,519 at the 2010 census. It was founded in 1832 and is named after Stephen Girard of Philadelphia, who purchased large land holdings in and around the town. It was incorporated as a borough in 1872.

Geography
Girardville is located at  (40.792104, -76.284555).

Demographics

As of the census of 2000, there were 1,742 people, 767 households, and 486 families residing in the borough. The population density was 3,327.4 people per square mile (1,293.4/km2). There were 886 housing units at an average density of 1,692.4 per square mile (657.9/km2). The racial makeup of the borough was 99.43% White, 0.11% Native American, 0.06% from other races, and 0.40% from two or more races. Hispanic or Latino of any race were 0.17% of the population.

There were 767 households, out of which 23.7% had children under the age of 18 living with them, 41.5% were married couples living together, 14.1% had a female householder with no husband present, and 36.6% were non-families. 34.4% of all households were made up of individuals, and 19.0% had someone living alone who was 65 years of age or older. The average household size was 2.27 and the average family size was 2.90.

In the borough the age distribution of the population shows 22.1% under the age of 18, 6.6% from 18 to 24, 27.3% from 25 to 44, 23.2% from 45 to 64, and 20.8% who were 65 years of age or older. The median age was 42 years. For every 100 females, there were 91.6 males. For every 100 females age 18 and over, there were 84.6 males.

The median income for a household in the borough was $23,702, and the median income for a family was $30,000. Males had a median income of $26,906 versus $20,433 for females. The per capita income for the borough was $13,735. About 10.5% of families and 14.6% of the population were below the poverty line, including 28.7% of those under age 18 and 9.4% of those age 65 or over.

Notable people

Dennis Cardinal Dougherty, Archbishop of the Archdiocese of Philadelphia, was born in the village of Homesville on the outskirts of Girardville in 1865 and served as Archbishop of Philadelphia from 1918 until his death in 1951.

A citizen who became famous in the "wild west" is "Captain Jack" Crawford, (also known as the "Poet Scout") western actor, scout for General George Crook's campaign in the Black Hills, native of Carndonagh, Ireland and performer with William F. Cody (Buffalo Bill), was postmaster and had a small general store in Girardville in 1869−1874, leaving town to go out west to find Gold. His poem "Only a Miner Killed" about his experiences as a miner in the region was said to be used by Bob Dylan as the basis for his song "Only a Hobo."

Another famous citizen was John "Black Jack" Kehoe, the high constable of Girardville during the 1870s, whose charismatic leadership in the fight for labor rights by the coal miners of the period earned him a place in local, state, national and world history. Jack Kehoe was a member of the Ancient Order of Hibernians and several divisions of the AOH now bear his name. Kehoe has gone down in history as a member of the Molly Maguires, a group of Irish immigrants who committed acts against the mine and railroad owners and was hanged along with 19 other alleged Molly Maguires in a series of trials. These hangings are popularly known as "The Day of the Rope". Today, Black Jack's tavern in Girardville, The Hibernian House, continues to be operated by his great-grandson, Joseph Wayne and is a popular destination for historians, genealogists, and tourists searching for information on the Molly Maguires, the coal region culture, and their Irish roots. Wayne's exhaustive efforts in the 1970s obtained a posthumous pardon for his great-grandfather through then Pennsylvania governor Milton Shapp. John Kehoe, a native of County Wicklow, Ireland, was buried in old St. Jerome's Cemetery in Tamaqua. His gravesite is a historical site maintained by the Ancient Order of Hibernians. 

Colonel Patrick H. Monaghan, a native of County Mayo, Ireland, who emigrated at the age of five and later became a naturalized American citizen, won the U.S. Medal of Honor, for recapturing the regimental flag of the 7th New York Heavy Artillery on June 17, 1864, while fighting in the Siege of Petersburg, Virginia during the American Civil War. A teacher in the Schuylkill County public schools from 1873 to 1916, Monaghan was also appointed to the post of superintendent of the school system in Girardville, a position he continued to hold from the early 1880s until August 20, 1909, when he was moved by his school board into an elementary school principal's position, according to The Philadelphia Inquirer:

The town of Girardville is alluded to in the comic book series Amelia Rules! Created by Girardville native Jimmy Gownley, the series, begun in 2001, has won several awards, been translated into numerous languages, and even turned into a stage musical. In 2008, it was named the Pennsylvania Library Association's One Book Award Winner.
Although Gownley is no longer a resident of Girardville, his work references the town in many ways, including being set in a fictional version of Connerton, a town formerly located between Girardville, and Lost Creek, as well as mentioning landmarks such as Centiole's Pizza

The Amelia Rules! series is currently published by Simon & Schuster.

Joseph, Charles and Albert Drulis were born and raised in Girardville and all three went on to star in football at Temple University. Charles and Albert went on to play in the NFL. All 3 brothers have been inducted into the Pennsylvania sports hall of fame. Chuck Drulis was an all-pro lineman for the Chicago Bears and went on to coach in the NFL after his playing career. Chuck Drulis is credited with introducing the "safety blitz" into the league while the defensive coordinator with the St. Louis Cardinals. Chuck's wife, Dsle Drulis, was the artist selected to design all of the art for the Pro Football Hall of Fame in Canton, Ohio. She used her husband and sons Chuck Jr. and Kerry as the models for the sculptures over the main entry to the facility.

Bob Simononis, born and raised in Girardville, was a star pitcher for the Girardville High School Blue Aces. Bob was named the Most Outstanding Player in the Third Annual Legion Pennsylvania East-West All-Star Game of 1949, and went on to be drafted by the Detroit Tigers of MLB. His baseball career was written about in Connie Mack's book, My 66 Years in the Big Leagues. Charles Fullis was another famous baseball player from Girardville.

Actress Mary Boland, born in Girardville, appeared in many films during the first half of the 20th century, including such popular ones as The Women, Ruggles of Red Gap and Pride and Prejudice.

Attorney John M. Elliott was born in Girardville on July 8, 1941, and died on March 12, 2021. Mr. Elliott was the great-grandson of an Irish immigrant who worked in the coal mines in Schuylkill County. His grandfather also worked in the mines. Mr. Elliott was an Eagle Scout who graduated from Harrisburg Catholic High School (now Bishop McDevitt High School) and attended St. Vincent College in Latrobe, PA. At St. Vincent, John was a four-year starter on the varsity baseball team and captained its 1963 West Penn Conference Championship Team. He graduated from Georgetown University Law Center in 1966, where he received the American Jurisprudence award for highest academic average in Constitutional Law and Jurisprudence. After graduation, he joined the Dilworth Paxson law firm in Philadelphia and co-chaired its litigation department. In 1986, Mr. Elliott started his own Philadelphia area law firm, which is currently known as Elliott Greenleaf, P.C. Mr. Elliott represented Fortune 500 companies and a broad range of individuals, including Philadelphia's Leonard Abramson, the founder of U.S. Healthcare, in a prominent and controversial privacy case against the TV show Inside Edition and Radnor's Milton Riseman in an age-discrimination case against Advanta Corp. that resulted in one of the largest financial verdicts ever in U.S. District Court for the Eastern District of Pennsylvania. In 1979, he won a posthumous pardon from the governor for Jack Kehoe, an Irish immigrant who was hanged for murder in 1878 and lived in Mr. Elliott's hometown of Girardville, Pa. Mr. Elliott was an expert in Irish history, and supported St. Patrick's College Maynooth, a leading seminary in County Kildare. In recognition of his contributions to Maynooth College, Cardinal Cahal B. Daly of Ireland dedicated the Salamanca Archives at St. Patrick's College, Maynooth, Ireland, in his honor in 1995. In 2001 Cardinal Desmond Connell conferred upon him the Gold Medal of St. Patrick.

Landmarks

Restaurants
Girardville is famous all over the coal region for its unique restaurants and pizzerias.  Centiole's Pizza is a family-owned establishments that is still in operation.  The Golden Moon is a reincarnation of what was formerly Nestor's Restaurant, and Tony's Lunch continues to serve their famous screamers and A-treat.

Churches 
Girardville had five churches, one  New Community Fellowship Church, one Methodist Episcopal, one Lutheran and two Roman Catholic Churches, St. Vincent de Paul and St. Joseph.  St. Joseph's Church was closed in July, 2015, while St. Vincent's was kept open as a worship center for the newly formed Parish of St. Charles Borremeo, with the main church in Ashland (the former St.Joseph's).

Radio 
Girardville was home to radio station WQDD-LP, until its license was cancelled by the Federal Communications Commission on June 27, 2018.

Notable events 
Girardville is the site of an annual St. Patrick's Day parade that is one of the  largest in Pennsylvania.  It made history on March 29, 2008, when former President Bill Clinton joined the marchers to the delight of 30,000 parade goers that lined the streets of the small coal town. The Annual AOH Girardville St. Patrick's Day Parade celebrated its 13th parade in 2016 and becomes more popular every year. It is known as "The Best and Biggest Little St. Patrick's Day Parade This Side of the Atlantic". It is truly a "Pipe Band" parade and those pipes call people back from all over Pennsylvania, the US, and beyond home to their Girardville roots.

Gallery

References

External links
 Upper Schuylkill
 Girardville: The culture, history, and people of Girardville, Pennsylvania

Populated places established in 1832
Municipalities of the Anthracite Coal Region of Pennsylvania
Boroughs in Schuylkill County, Pennsylvania
Coal towns in Pennsylvania
1872 establishments in Pennsylvania